Hatikvah is the national anthem of the State of Israel. Part of 19th-century Jewish poetry, the theme of the Romantic composition reflects the 2,000-year-old desire of the Jewish people to return to the Land of Israel in order to reclaim it as a free and sovereign nation-state. The piece's lyrics are adapted from a work by Naftali Herz Imber, a Jewish poet from Złoczów, Austrian Galicia. Imber wrote the first version of the poem in 1877, when he was hosted by a Jewish scholar in Iași, Romania.

History

The text of Hatikvah was written in 1878 by Naftali Herz Imber, a Jewish poet from Zolochiv, a city nicknamed "The City of Poets", then in Austrian Poland, today in Ukraine. His words "Lashuv le'eretz avotenu" (to return to the land of our forefathers) expressed its aspiration.

In 1882, Imber emigrated to Ottoman-ruled Palestine and read his poem to the pioneers of the early Jewish villages—Rishon LeZion, Rehovot, Gedera, and Yesud Hama'ala. In 1887, Shmuel Cohen, a very young (17 or 18 years old) resident of Rishon LeZion with a musical background, sang the poem by using a melody he knew from Romania and making it into a song, after witnessing the emotional responses of the Jewish farmers who had heard the poem. Cohen's musical adaptation served as a catalyst and facilitated the poem's rapid spread throughout the Zionist communities of Palestine.

Imber's nine-stanza poem, "Tikvatenu" ("Our Hope"), put into words his thoughts and feelings following the establishment of Petah Tikva (literally "Opening of Hope"). Published in Imber's first book , was subsequently adopted as an anthem by the Hovevei Zion and later by the Zionist Movement.

Before the founding of Israel
The Zionist Organization conducted two competitions for an anthem, the first in 1898 and the second, at the Fourth Zionist Congress, in 1900. The quality of the entries were all judged unsatisfactory and none was selected. Imber's "Tikvatenu", however, was popular, and a sessions at the Fifth Zionist Congress in Basel in 1901 concluded with the singing of the poem. During the Sixth Zionist Congress at Basel in 1903, the poem was sung by those opposed to accepting the proposal for a Jewish state in Uganda, their position in favor of the Jewish homeland in Palestine expressed in the line "An eye still gazes toward Zion".

Although the poem was sung at subsequent congresses, it was only at the Eighteenth Zionist Congress in Prague in 1933 that a motion passed formally adopting "Hatikvah" as the anthem of the Zionist movement.

The British Mandate government briefly banned its public performance and broadcast from 1919, in response to an increase in Arab anti-Zionist political activity. 

A former member of the Sonderkommando reported that the song was spontaneously sung by Czech Jews at the entrance to the Auschwitz-Birkenau gas chamber in 1944. While singing they were beaten by Waffen-SS guards.

Adoption as the Israeli national anthem

When the State of Israel was established in 1948, "Hatikvah" was unofficially proclaimed the national anthem. It did not officially become the national anthem until November 2004, when an abbreviated and edited version was sanctioned by the Knesset in an amendment to the Flag and Coat-of-Arms Law (now renamed the Flag, Coat-of-Arms, and National Anthem Law).

In its modern rendering, the official text of the anthem incorporates only the first stanza and refrain of the original poem. The predominant theme in the remaining stanzas is the establishment of a sovereign and free nation in the Land of Israel, a hope largely seen as fulfilled with the founding of the State of Israel.

Musical composition

The melody for "Hatikvah" derives from "La Mantovana", a 16th-century Italian song, composed by Giuseppe Cenci (Giuseppino del Biado) ca. 1600 with the text "Fuggi, fuggi, fuggi da questo cielo". Its earliest known appearance in print was in the del Biado's collection of madrigals. It also served as a basis for a number of folk songs throughout Central Europe, for example the popular Slovenian children song . The melody was used by the Czech composer Bedřich Smetana in his set of six symphonic poems celebrating Bohemia, Má vlast (My Homeland), namely in the second poem named after the river which flows through Prague, Vltava. The melody was also used by the French composer Camille Saint-Saëns in Rhapsodie bretonne.

The adaptation of the music for "Hatikvah" was set by Samuel Cohen in 1888. Cohen himself recalled many years later that he had hummed "Hatikvah" based on the melody from the song he had heard in Romania, "Carul cu boi" (the ox-driven cart).

The harmony of "Hatikvah" follows a minor scale, which is often perceived as mournful in tone and is uncommon in national anthems. As the title "The Hope" and the words suggest, the import of the song is optimistic and the overall spirit uplifting.

Usage in sporting events
In October 2017, after judoka Tal Flicker won gold in the 2017 Abu Dhabi Grand Slam in the United Arab Emirates, officials played the International Judo Federation (IJF) anthem, instead of "Hatikvah", which Flicker sang privately.

Usage in film
American composer John Williams adapted "Hatikvah" in the 2005 historical drama film Munich.

"Hatikvah" is also used both in the adaptation of Leon Uris's novel, Exodus, and in the 1993 film Schindler's List.

In 2022 Roman Shumunov filmed a TV series titled  about the Israeli youth encounter with The Holocaust.

Renditions, interpretations, and usage in popular music
Barbra Streisand performed "Hatikvah" in 1978 at a televised music special called The Stars Salute Israel at 30, a performance which included a conversation by telephone and video link with former Prime Minister Golda Meir.

American musician Anderson .Paak's 2016 release "Come Down" contains a sample of "Hatikvah" in English translation, attributed to producer Hi-Tek.

A 2018 rendition of the anthem by Israeli Jewish singer Daniel Sa'adon that took inspiration from the Levantine music and dance style dabke caused controversy and accusations of appropriation of Palestinian culture, as well as consternation from some Israelis due to the tune's popularity with Hamas. Sa'adon, however, said that his desire was to "show that the unity of cultures is possible through music", and that he has a longtime appreciation for Southwest Asian and North African musical styles, having grown up with Tunisian music in the home. Sa'adon said that despite receiving "abusive comments" from both the right and the left of the political spectrum, he also received praise from friends and colleagues in the music world, including Palestinian Israelis.

Official text

The official text of the Israeli national anthem corresponds to the first stanza and amended refrain of the original nine-stanza poem by Naftali Herz Imber. Along with the original Hebrew, the corresponding transliteration and English translation are listed below.

Hebrew lyrics

English translation

Interpretation 

Some people compare the first line of the refrain, "Our hope is not yet lost" (""), to the opening of the Polish national anthem, "Poland Is Not Yet Lost" ("") or the Ukrainian national anthem, "Ukraine Has Not Yet Perished" (""). This line may also be a Biblical allusion to Ezekiel's "Vision of the Dried Bones" (Ezekiel 37: "…Behold, they say, Our bones are dried, and our hope is lost (Hebrew:אבדה תקותנו)"), describing the despair of the Jewish people in exile, and God's promise to redeem them and lead them back to the Land of Israel.

The official text of "Hatikvah" is relatively short; indeed it is a single complex sentence, consisting of two clauses: the subordinate clause posits the condition ("As long as… A soul still yearns… And… An eye still watches…"), while the independent clause specifies the outcome ("Our hope is not yet lost… To be a free nation in our land").

Objections and alternate proposals

By religious Jews
Some religious Jews have criticised "Hatikvah" for its lack of religious emphasis: There is no mention of God or the Torah.

Rabbi Abraham Isaac Kook wrote an alternative anthem titled "HaEmunah" ("The Faith") which he proposed as a replacement for "Hatikvah". But he did not object to the singing of "Hatikvah", and in fact endorsed it.

J. Simcha Cohen wrote that Dovid Lifshitz used "Lihyot am dati": "to be a religious nation in our land."

By non-Jewish Israelis
Liberalism and the Right to Culture, written by Avishai Margalit and Moshe Halbertal, provides a social scientific perspective on the cultural dynamics in Israel, a country that is a vital home to many diverse religious groups. More specifically, Margalit and Halbertal cover the various responses towards "Hatikvah", which they establish as the original anthem of a Zionist movement, one that holds a 2,000-year-long hope of returning to the homeland ("Zion and Jerusalem") after a long period of exile.

To introduce the controversy of Israel's national anthem, the authors provide two instances where "Hatikvah" is rejected for the estrangement that it creates between the minority cultural groups of Israel and its national Jewish politics. Those that object find trouble in the mere fact that the national anthem is exclusively Jewish while a significant proportion of the state's citizenry is not Jewish and lacks any connection to the anthem's content and implications, despite the fact that many other religious countries also have anthems emphasising their religion.

As Margalit and Halbertal continue to discuss, "Hatikvah" symbolises for many Arab-Israelis the struggle of loyalty that comes with having to dedicate oneself to either their historical or religious identity.

Specifically, Israeli-Arabs object to "Hatikvah" due to its explicit allusions to Jewishness. In particular, the text's reference to the yearnings of "a Jewish soul" is often cited as preventing non-Jews from personally identifying with the anthem. Notable persons whose refusal to sing Hatikvah was brought to public attention include Saleh Tarif, the first non-Jew appointed to the Israeli cabinet, Raleb Majadale, the first Muslim to be appointed as a minister in the Israeli cabinet, and Salim Joubran, an Israeli Arab justice on Israel's Supreme Court. For this reason from time to time proposals have been made to change the national anthem or to modify the text to make it inclusive of non-Jewish Israelis.

See also

National symbols of Israel
Culture of Israel
Music of Israel

References

Notes

Citations

Hebrew-language songs
Israeli songs
Asian anthems
National symbols of Israel
Jewish folk songs
Jewish poetry
National anthem compositions in D minor
National anthems
1878 poems
Zionism